Fırat Tanış (born 5 May 1975) is a Turkish actor and musician. He has appeared in more than thirty films since 1995. He is of Turkish Meskhetian ancestry. He played as Koyu Bilal in franchise comedy film series and tv series "Geniş Aile".

Theatre
 Erkek Arkadaşım Bir Feminist - 2019
 Martı - 2017
 Ayrılık - 2017
 Gelin Tanış Olalım - 2016
 E-mülteci.com - 2016
 Testosteron - 2008
 Hırçın Kız - 2006
 Barış (oyun) - 2002
 Woyzeck

Web series

Tv Series

Filmography

References

External links 

1975 births
Living people
Male actors from Istanbul
Meskhetian Turkish people
Turkish male film actors
Turkish male television actors